Piqua (YTB-793) was a United States Navy  named for Piqua, Ohio. She was the second ship to bear the name.

Construction

The contract for Piqua was awarded 16 June 1966. She was laid down on 29 September 1966 at Marinette, Wisconsin, by Marinette Marine and launched 25 April 1967.

Operational history

Placed in service at Submarine Base New London, Connecticut, Piqua served the 3rd Naval District and Atlantic Fleet ships operating in New England waters. She was then assigned to SUBRON 14, Holy Loch, Scotland circa 1964 to 1970.

Stricken from the Navy List 13 March 2001 she was sold by the Defense Reutilization and Marketing Service 20 November 2001. Currently in civilian service as Ellen McAllister.

References

External links
 

 

Natick-class large harbor tugs
Ships built by Marinette Marine
1967 ships